This is a timeline of Barbadian history, comprising important legal and territorial changes and political events in Barbados and its predecessor states.  To read about the background to these events, see History of Barbados and History of the Caribbean. See also the list of Governors and Prime Ministers of Barbados.

16th century

17th century

18th century

19th century

20th century

21st century

References

 
Notable dates, Government of Barbados
Worldstatesmen.org - Barbados rulers
 Case Study: "The Barbados Experience" - political history, by the Department of Public Sector Reform

Barbadian
 
Barbados history-related lists